Gideon Buthana Mthembu (born September 25, 1963) is a Swazi sports official and retired runner.

He finished 53rd in the 1988 Olympic marathon. His personal best time was 2:17.08 hours, achieved in 1987. He also competed in the 800 and 1500 metres at the 1986 Commonwealth Games without reaching the final.

He served as president of the Athletics Association of Swaziland from 2008 to 2012.

References

1963 births
Living people
Swazi male middle-distance runners
Swazi male marathon runners
Athletes (track and field) at the 1986 Commonwealth Games
Commonwealth Games competitors for Eswatini
Athletes (track and field) at the 1988 Summer Olympics
Olympic athletes of Eswatini
Swazi referees and umpires